Bharathiraja (born 17 July 1941) is an Indian film director and actor who works mainly in the Tamil film industry. Making his debut in 1977 with 16 Vayathinile, he is known for realistic and sensitive portrayals of rural life in his films. As of 2017, he has won six National Film Awards, four Filmfare Awards South, two Tamil Nadu State Film Awards and a Nandi Award. He has also directed films in Telugu and Hindi. The Government of India honoured him with the Padma Shri award, India's fourth-highest civilian honour, in 2004 for his contribution to the film industry. In 2005, he was conferred with the Doctor of Letters (honorary degree) from Sathyabama University.

Film career
Bharathiraja started his film career as an assistant to Kannada filmmaker Puttanna Kanagal. Later, he assisted P. Pullaiah, M. Krishnan Nair, Avinasi Mani and A. Jagannathan. His first film 16 Vayathinile, for which he wrote the script, broke the then existing convention to create a new genre of village cinema. The film is now regarded as a milestone in the history of Tamil Cinema. About the film, Bharathiraja said: "This movie was meant to be a black & white art film produced with the help of National Film Development Corporation", but turned out to be a commercially successful colour film and a starting point for several important careers. His next film Kizhake Pogum Rail produced similar results and eventually brought in criticisms that Bharathiraja was capable of catering only to village audiences. This led him to make Sigappu Rojakkal, about a psychopathic woman-hater that was totally westernized in terms of both conception and production.

Bharathiraja confirmed his versatility and refusal to be tied down to one particular genre with an experimental film Nizhalgal (1980), and the action thriller Tik Tik Tik (1981). But undoubtedly, rural themes proved to be his strong suit as his biggest hits in the 1980s: Alaigal Oivathillai (1981), Mann Vasanai (1983) and Muthal Mariyathai (1985) were strong love stories in a village backdrop. Muthal Mariyathai starred Sivaji Ganesan in the lead, playing a middle-aged village head. Radha is a poor young woman who moves into his village for a living. The love that bonds these two humans separated not just by age but also by caste and class, is told by Bharathiraja with poetic touches.

Vedham Pudhithu dealt with the caste issue in a stronger manner. The film's narrative was seamless and starred Sathyaraj as Balu Thevar. It contains some of Bharathiraja's trademark touches as well as several ground-breaking scenes. Vedham Pudhithu made a revolutionary thoughts about caste discriminations in Brahmin and other upper castes in Tamil Nadu. Bharathiraja has successfully managed to modernise his film-making techniques for the 1990s. The commercial success of Kizhakku Cheemaiyile and the awards that Karuththamma garnered stand as testimony to his ability to thrill the younger generation as well. Bharathiraja was on the same stage in 1996 to receive another National Award for Anthimanthaarai.

In late 1996, Bharathiraja was signed on to direct two films, with the Sarathkumar-starrer Vaakkapatta Bhoomi announced in October. The following month, he began work on a film titled Siragugal Murivadhillai, starring Napolean, Heera Rajagopal and Prakash Raj. Both films were later shelved. He planned to revive Vaakkapatta Bhoomi with Cheran during late 2004, but the collaboration did not materialise.

His 2001 film Kadal Pookal won him that year's National Film Award for Best Screenplay. The well-known Tamil film director Bhagyaraj was one of his assistant directors. In 2008, Bharathiraja made his television debut with series Thekkathi Ponnu which aired on Kalaignar TV. He went on to direct two other series Appanum Aathaalum and Muthal Mariyathai for the same channel.

During early 2016, Bharathiraja was embroiled in a legal tussle with director Bala on making a film titled Kutra Parambarai, though neither filmmaker eventually made their respective films. He later moved on to plan a film starring director Vasanth's son, Ritwik Varun, and Vikram's nephew, but the film was dropped after two schedules. In 2018, Bharathirajaa was working on a film titled November 8, Iravu 8 Mani starring Vidharth, which narrates events following the decision to demonetise certain banknotes in India.

Style, critique and public perception 
When the old era was dominated by films shot inside studios, Bharathiraja directed village themed films that inspired Tamil cinema to capture live locations. Array of village films in Tamil cinema started after his trendsetting film 16 Vayathinile. He changed the attire of male lead role as simple and without much cosmetics and female leads in his films as dusky looking which were before dominated by fair skinned ladies. He started the style of directors speaking to the audience with his famous dialogue "En Iniya Thamizh Makkale (My sweet Tamil people)". Bharathiraja is revered as one of the best directors of Indian cinema. His ideas were original and his subjects were complex ideas expressed in a manner every common man could understand.

He is also known for introducing a number of new faces to the film industry. He has introduced many actors as new faces notable among them are Karthik, Radha, Revathi, Raadhika, and Vijayashanti. Apart from lead actors, he has introduced a bunch of supporting actors. Notable among them include Janagaraj, Vadivukkarasi, Chandrasekhar, Pandiyan, and Napoleon. As an experimental initiative he used to give new actors a small role in his films later they becoming popular among people and turning to busy actors. Many present day directors who were unknown to people turned into actors after playing a debut petty role in his films: K. Bhagyaraj, Manivannan, Manobala, Thiagarajan, and Ponvannan are among them. He was also instrumental in portraying Sathyaraj for the first time in lead role.

Bharathiraja inspired many young film makers and runs a school called Bharathi Raja International Institute of Cinema (BRIIC) on film making.

Bharathiraja directed socially themed films with special emphasis on women and their complicated interpersonal relationships. He addressed other social evils like caste discrimination in his films.

Personal life 
Bharathiraja was born as Chinnasamy to parents Periyamayathevar and Karuthammal. He married ChandraLeela in 1974 and has two children Manoj Bharathiraja (born 1976) and Janani (born 1979).

Manoj is an actor who was introduced in Tajmahal and he married actress Nandana. Janani is married to Malaysian Rajkumar Thambiraja. Bharathiraja's brother-in-law Manojkumar has directed films such as Mannukkul Vairam, Vandicholai Chinraasu, Vaanavil and Guru Paarvai. His brother Jayaraj made his acting debut with Kaththukkutti. His relative Stalin is a television actor who acted in serials such as Saravanan Meenatchi and 7C.

Awards

Civilian honours
 2004 – Padmashri from the Government of India

National Film Awards
 1982 – National Film Award for Best Feature Film in Telugu for Seethakoka Chiluka (Director)
 1986 – National Film Award for Best Feature Film in Tamil for Mudhal Mariyathai (Producer & Director)
 1988 – National Film Award for Best Film on Other Social Issues Vedham Pudhithu (Director)
 1995 – National Film Award for Best Film on Family Welfare for Karuththamma (Director)
 1996 – National Film Award for Best Feature Film in Tamil for Anthimanthaarai (Director)
 2001 – National Film Award for Best Screenplay for Kadal Pookkal (Director & Writer)

Filmfare Awards South
 1978 – Best Tamil Director for Sigappu Rojakkal
 1987 - Best Tamil Film for Vedham Pudhithu
 1987 - Best Tamil Director for Vedham Pudhithu
 1994 - Best Tamil Film for Karuthamma

Tamil Nadu State Film Awards
 1977 – Best Director Award for 16 Vayathinile
 1979 - Tamil Nadu State Film Award for Best Film - Second Prize - Puthiya Vaarpugal
 1981 – Best Director Award for Alaigal Oivathillai
 1994 - Best Film Portraying Woman in Good Light for Karuththamma
 2001 - Tamil Nadu State Film Honorary Award-  Arignar Anna Award in 2001
 2003 – Best Film in First place Eera Nilam

Nandi Awards
 1981 – Nandi Award for Best Director for Seethakoka Chiluka

Vijay Awards
 2012 – Contribution to Tamil Cinema
 2013 – Best Supporting Actor for Pandiya Naadu

Other awards
 1980 – South Indian Film Technicians : Best Technician Award for Kallukkul Eeram
 2005 – Honorary doctorate (D.Litt) from Sathyabama University
2015 – SIIMA Lifetime Achievement Award

Legal issues
 He attended the Heroes Day Conference at Jaffna and appreciated its bravery and valour.
 He organised a protest by Nadigar Sangam against the Indian state of Karnataka for not releasing Cauvery water at Neyveli. During an interview to Sun TV channel, film co-stars such as Sarath Kumar and wife Raadhika who attended the conference accused him of using that opportunity to eulogise current Tamil Nadu Chief Minister Jayalalitha and launching attacks on actor Rajinikanth's home state's ethnicity.

Filmography

Films

Television
List of TV Serials directed by Bharathiraja and aired at Kalaignar TV.

 Thekkathi Ponnu
 Appanum Aathalum 
 Muthal Mariyathai

Dubbing artist
Vijayan (Niram Maaratha Pookkal, Mann Vasanai) 
Thiagarajan (Alaigal Oivathillai)
Nizhalgal Ravi (Mann Vasanai, Vedham Pudhithu)
Manivannan (Kodi Parakuthu)
Thennavan (En Uyir Thozhan)

Singer
"Kaadu Pottakaadu" (Karuthamma)

References

External links

Tamil film directors
Tamil-language film directors
Tamil screenwriters
Male actors from Tamil Nadu
1941 births
Living people
Tamil Nadu State Film Awards winners
Telugu film directors
Recipients of the Padma Shri in arts
Filmfare Awards South winners
Nandi Award winners
20th-century Indian film directors
21st-century Indian film directors
People from Theni district
20th-century Indian male actors
Film directors from Tamil Nadu
Screenwriters from Tamil Nadu
Best Original Screenplay National Film Award winners
Directors who won the Best Film on Family Welfare National Film Award
Directors who won the Best Film on Other Social Issues National Film Award
South Indian International Movie Awards winners
Tamil television directors
Tamil television writers